Europa Report is a 2013 American science fiction film directed by Sebastián Cordero and written by Philip Gelatt. It stars Christian Camargo, Anamaria Marinca, Michael Nyqvist, Daniel Wu, Karolina Wydra, and Sharlto Copley. A found footage film, it recounts the fictional story of the first crewed mission to Europa, one of the four Galilean moons of Jupiter. Despite a disastrous technical failure that causes the loss of all communications with Earth, and a series of further crises, the crew continues its mission to Europa and finds mounting evidence of life on this Galilean moon of Jupiter.

Plot
Dr. Samantha Unger, CEO of Europa Ventures, narrates the story of the Europa One mission. Six astronauts embark on a privately funded mission to Jupiter's moon Europa to find potential sources of life.  The crew members are commander William Xu, pilot Rosa Dasque, chief science officer Daniel Luxembourg, marine biology science officer Katya Petrovna, junior engineer James Corrigan, and chief engineer Andrei Blok.

After six months of mission time, a solar storm hits the ship, knocking out communication with mission control. Blok and Corrigan perform an extra-vehicular activity (EVA) to repair the system from outside, but an accident rips Blok's suit. While he is being guided back into the airlock, Blok notices that Corrigan's suit has been coated with hydrazine and he cannot enter the airlock or else he would contaminate the rest of the ship. Blok attempts to save Corrigan by taking him out of his suit, but he blacks out from a lack of oxygen. Knowing there is no hope for himself, Corrigan pushes Blok into the airlock, thus propelling himself away from the ship as it continues its journey to Europa. Stranded, he dies in space; the crew continue with the mission, demoralized by Corrigan's death.

After twenty months, the ship goes into orbit around Europa and its lunar lander lands safely on Europa, but misses its target zone. The crew drills through the ice and releases a probe into the underlying sea. Blok, who is sleep-deprived and eliciting concern in the rest of the crew, sees a light outside the ship but he is unable to record it or otherwise convince the crew of its occurrence. The probe is struck by an unknown lighted object and contact with it is lost.

Petrovna insists on collecting samples on Europa's surface; the crew votes and she is allowed to go. Analyzing the samples, Luxembourg discovers traces of a single-celled organism. Petrovna sees a blue light in the distance and decides to investigate it. As she approaches the light the ice below her breaks and she falls through. Her head-mounted camera continues to broadcast, displaying her last moments as the blue bioluminescence is reflected in her eyes, before cutting out.

The crew agrees to leave to report their discovery to Earth, but the engines malfunction. As the lander hurtles back to Europa's surface, Xu unbuckles from his seat to dump water shielding to reduce the impact speed. Remarkably, the ship crashes at the originally-targeted landing site. On impact, Xu is killed and the lander is damaged, leaking oxygen and losing heat. It begins to sink into the ice.

Blok and Luxembourg suit up to make repairs outside the ship. Luxembourg tries to descend but dies as he falls through the ice. Blok knows that there is no chance that he alone will be able to repair the lander before it sinks. Instead, he manages to fix the communication link to the orbiting mother ship, at the expense of turning off the life support systems, just before the same blue light Petrovna saw approaches and is killed as he falls through the ice as well.

Dasque re-establishes communication with Earth; all the collected images and data that have been saved since the solar storm are relayed to Earth via the mother ship, just as the ice cracks and the lander begins to sink. Alone and anticipating her death, Dasque opens the airlock to flood the lander in hopes of revealing the source of the light. As the water rises to the cockpit, she sees a tentacled, bioluminescent creature rising toward her before the camera cuts out.

In the epilogue, narrator Samantha Unger confirms that the crew of Europa had discovered life and exceeded every expectation, as the footage plays from an earlier scene of the crew posing in front of the camera.

Cast
 Anamaria Marinca as Rosa Dasque
 Michael Nyqvist as Andrei Blok
 Karolina Wydra as Katya Petrovna
 Daniel Wu as William Xu
 Sharlto Copley as James Corrigan
 Christian Camargo as Daniel Luxembourg
 Embeth Davidtz as Dr. Samantha Unger
 Dan Fogler as Dr. Nikita Solokov
 Isiah Whitlock, Jr. as Dr. Tarik Pamuk
 Neil deGrasse Tyson as himself (archive footage)

Production
Filming took place in Brooklyn, New York. The first image from the film was revealed on February 11, 2012. A viral website to promote the film was launched shortly afterward.

The screenplay was written by Philip Gelatt and the production design was done by Eugenio Caballero. It was scored by Bear McCreary. The movie is a found footage film and follows a nonlinear progression.

The crew used as inspiration real footage from the International Space Station and space walks from the Space Shuttle. The space ship was designed through computer graphics, giving high detail to the camera angles to be used in the film. Weightlessness was simulated with balance balls, suspension from wires was used for interior shots. The flooding ship was filmed on a one-third scale model.

The aspect of the moon Europa was based for accuracy on data from NASA and Jet Propulsion Laboratory (JPL) maps of the moon's surface. The creature's design included bioluminescence from the initial concepts. The visual effects supervisor stated that the creature was based on a cross of an octopus and a squid, with early sketches resembling a jellyfish and a manta ray.

An online trailer was released on May 20, 2012. The film was released on Video on Demand, iTunes, and Google Play Movies & TV on June 27, 2013, and was released theatrically on August 2, 2013.

Reception
Europa Report has received generally positive reviews from critics. Rotten Tomatoes gives the film an 81% "Certified Fresh" rating based on 80 reviews, its summary reading, "Claustrophobic and stylish, Europa Report is a slow-burning thriller that puts the science back into science fiction."  Review aggregation website Metacritic gives a rating of 68 out of 100 based on reviews from 25 critics, which indicates "generally favorable" reviews.

Justin Chang, of Variety magazine, called the film "A reasonably plausible and impressively controlled achievement." while Space.com said the film was "One of the most thrilling and realistic depictions of space exploration since Moon or 2001: A Space Odyssey." Fearnet said the film was "One of the most sincere, suspenseful and fascinating science fiction films of the past few years."

The film was nominated for the Bradbury Award by the members of SFWA.

See also

List of films featuring extraterrestrials
Jupiter's moons in fiction

References

External links

 
 
 
 

2013 films
2013 science fiction films
Fiction set on Europa (moon)
Jupiter in film
2010s Russian-language films
American space adventure films
Found footage films
American nonlinear narrative films
Films about astronauts
Films directed by Sebastián Cordero
Films scored by Bear McCreary
Films shot in New York City
Hard science fiction films
2010s English-language films
Films about extraterrestrial life
2010s American films
Fiction set in extraterrestrial oceans